Bernhard Rogge (4 November 1899 – 29 June 1982) was a German naval officer who, during World War II, commanded a merchant raider. Later, he became a Konteradmiral in West Germany's navy.

Rogge became a Vizeadmiral (vice-admiral) by the end of World War II, and, when the West German navy was established after the war, returned to service as a Konteradmiral (rear-admiral). He also was one of the few German officers of flag rank who was not arrested by the Allies after the war.

Early life
Rogge was born in Schleswig, the son of a Lutheran minister, and was himself devoutly religious.

Military career
 1915 — joins the Kaiserliche Marine (Imperial German Navy) as a volunteer
 After World War I — serves on various cruisers
 Mid-1930s to 1939 — commander of the sail training ship SSS Albert Leo Schlageter
 September 1939 — assigned to the 
 Mid-December 1939 — Atlantis is formally commissioned
 31 March 1940 — Atlantis sets out to sea
 11 November 1940 — Atlantis  scuttles British cargo ship  near Sumatra after retrieving top secret documents for which the Japanese government would reward Rogge with an ornate katana in April 1943
 22 November 1941 — Atlantis is sunk by 
15 Apr 1942- Chief of Staff to Inspector of Training Affairs
1 March 1943- promoted to Konteradmiral and Inspector of Training Affairs
20 Sept 1944- Cdr Fleet Training Formations
1 March 1945- promoted to Vizeadmiral
 After World War II — discharged
 1 June 1957 — enters the post-World War II West German Bundesmarine with the rank of Konteradmiral
 1 June 1957 – 29 September 1957 — delegated with the Command of Military Area Command I
 30 September 1957 – 31 March 1962 — Commander of Military Area Command I
 15 April 1958 – 31 March 1962 — at the same time, NATO Commander of Land Forces in Schleswig-Holstein (COMLAND-SCHLESWIG)
 31 March 1962 — retires from the German Bundesmarine as a Konteradmiral

Assessment

J. Armstrong White, captain of the British merchant ship City of Bagdad, which Atlantis sank in July 1941, stated, "His treatment of prisoners left respect, instead of hatred".  White later wrote the foreword to Atlantis, the Story of a German Surface Raider, written by U. Mohr & A. V. Sellwood.

Admiral Karl Dönitz, who was prosecuted for war crimes at the Nuremberg Trials, cited his own support of Rogge, who had a Jewish grandparent, in an effort to clear himself of the charge of being antisemitic.

Rogge confirmed the death sentence of the 21-year-old sailor Johann Christian Süß. Süß was sentenced to death on 10 May 1945, two days after the German capitulation, for "undermining the discipline" and "disruptive speeches" based on paragraph 5 numeral 2 of the Kriegssonderstrafrechtsverordnung (KSSVO—Special War Criminal Regulation). Süß was executed by firing squad on 11 May 1945.

Awards
 Iron Cross (1914) 2nd and 1st Class
 General Honor Decoration 
 Honour Cross of the World War 1914/1918 (7 November 1934)
 War Merit Cross 2rd Class with Swords
 Wehrmacht Long Service Award, 4th to 1st Class
 Italian Bronze Medal of Military Valor (Medaglia di bronzo al Valore Militare) (25 September 1941)
 Japanese sword (27 April 1942)
 Clasp to the Iron Cross (1939) 2nd and 1st Class
 Knight's Cross of the Iron Cross with Oak Leaves
 Knight's Cross on 7 December 1940 as Kapitän zur See and commander of auxiliary cruiser Atlantis (HSK 2)
 Oak Leaves on 31 December 1941 as Kapitän zur See and commander of HSK 2 auxiliary cruiser Atlantis (Ship 16)
 Auxiliary Cruiser Badge with diamonds.
 Commanders Cross, Order of Merit of the Federal Republic of Germany (31 March 1962)

Works 
Rogge, Bernhard, and Wolfgang Frank. Under Ten Flags. New York: Ballantine, 1960; which is a translation of Schiff 16.

References

Citations

Bibliography

External links
 

1899 births
1982 deaths
People from Schleswig, Schleswig-Holstein
People from the Province of Schleswig-Holstein
Vice admirals of the Kriegsmarine
Bundesmarine admirals
German Christians
Recipients of the Bronze Medal of Military Valor
Recipients of the Knight's Cross of the Iron Cross with Oak Leaves
Commanders Crosses of the Order of Merit of the Federal Republic of Germany
Recipients of the clasp to the Iron Cross, 1st class
Imperial German Navy personnel of World War I
Reichsmarine personnel
Counter admirals of the German Navy
20th-century Freikorps personnel